The Kilkenny–Offaly rivalry is a hurling rivalry between Irish county teams Kilkenny and Offaly, who first played each other in 1899. Kilkenny's home ground is Nowlan Park and Offaly's home ground is O'Connor Park.

While Kilkenny are regarded as one of the "big three" of hurling, with Cork and Tipperary completing the trio, Offaly are ranked joint seventh in the all-time roll of honour and have enjoyed sporadic periods of dominance at various stages throughout the history of the championship. The two teams have won a combined total of 40 All-Ireland Senior Hurling Championship titles.

Statistics

All time results

Legend

1899-1908

1980-2014

Records

Scorelines

 Biggest championship win:
 For Kilkenny: Kilkenny 6-28 - 0-15 Offaly, 2005 Leinster semi-final, Croke Park, 12 June 2005
 For Offaly: Offaly 4-15 - 1-8 Kilkenny, 1990 Leinster semi-final, Croke Park, 17 June 1990
 Highest aggregate:
 Kilkenny 5-32 - 1-18 Offaly, 2014 Leinster quarter-final, Nowlan Park, 7 June 2014

Top scorer

Attendance

Highest attendance:
65,491 - Offaly 2-16 - 1-13 Kilkenny, All-Ireland final, Croke Park, 13 September 1998

External links
 Kilkenny v Offaly all-time results

Offaly
Offaly county hurling team rivalries